James Michael Derrick (September 19, 1943 – January 14, 2009) was a left fielder and first baseman in Major League Baseball who played briefly for the Boston Red Sox during the  season. Listed at 6' 0", 190 lb., he batted left-handed and threw right-handed. He was born in Columbia, South Carolina.

Derrick graduated from Brookland-Cayce High School in 1961. While there he lettered in Football, Baseball, Basketball, and Track. For football he was selected as an All-American and the State AAA Back of the Year in 1960. Also, in 1960, he was a unanimous all-state selection. He was a member of the 1960 Shrine Bowl team and attended the University of South Carolina on a football and baseball scholarship.

Derrick signed as an amateur free agent with the Pittsburgh Pirates in 1962, then was sent by Pittsburgh to the Detroit Tigers in exchange for Chris Cannizzaro in 1967. During his minor league baseball career, Derrick was primarily a first baseman. Later, he was selected by the Red Sox from Detroit in the 1969 Rule 5 major league draft.

In a 24-game career, Derrick posted a .212 batting average (7-for-33) with five RBI, three runs, and a double without home runs. Used mostly in pinch-hitting and pinch-running roles, he made two appearances in left field and one at first base.

He died in January 2009 in Columbia, South Carolina.

References

Sources

Retrosheet

1943 births
2009 deaths
Asheville Tourists players
Baseball players from Columbia, South Carolina
Boston Red Sox players
Columbus Jets players
Grand Forks Chiefs players
Kinston Eagles players
Louisville Colonels (minor league) players
Major League Baseball first basemen
Major League Baseball left fielders
Reno Silver Sox players
Tacoma Twins players
Toledo Mud Hens players